The 1977 Tirreno–Adriatico was the 12th edition of the Tirreno–Adriatico cycle race and was held from 12 March to 16 March 1977. The race started in Ferentino and finished in San Benedetto del Tronto. The race was won by Roger De Vlaeminck of the Brooklyn team.

General classification

References

1977
1977 in Italian sport